The BeatBuddy is a digital drum machine made by Singular Sound which is housed in the form of a stompbox unit. The floor-based format and pedal footswitch enables musicians (like guitar, bass and keyboard players, among others) to control the device "hands-free" while they are performing an instrument with their hands.

The BeatBuddy is designed to be used in live performances, with the user determining when different sections of the song (such as the verse, chorus, and solo section) will start, and giving them the flexibility to extend or delay sections, or pause the beat. Like other stompbox pedals, it can be controlled by foot presses on the pedal; the BeatBuddy recognizes single taps, holding down the pedal, releasing it, and double-pressing. Unlike many other drum machines, which use synthesized drum sounds programmed into patterns, the BeatBuddy uses samples of non-quantized drum playing recorded by a professional drummer in a studio.

Singular Sound is a Miami-based brand. The firm first engineered and manufactured the device in 2014, after crowdfunding via Indiegogo. The BeatBuddy was intended to be a foot-controlled alternative to traditional tabletop, "hands-on" drum machines (as the Roland TR-909 or the Roger Linn's LinnDrum). Since its release in 2014, the BeatBuddy has garnered positive reviews from magazines like Guitar Player, Guitar World and Sound On Sound, and won the Best in Show award at the 2015 NAMM Show.

Design and operation

Although its design resembles an ordinary guitar effects pedal (like the Boss or DigiTech ones), the BeatBuddy is a drum machine and it does not make any audio effect or processing to the input signals.
It has two 1/4" input jacks for instruments or audio devices, but the BeatBuddy can also work as a "standalone" device (that is, without anything plugged in), if required. The input jacks are a convenience to allow performers to simplify their setup; with the "pass-through" inputs, an electric piano player, say, who is playing a one man band show can plug their piano into the BeatBuddy, then plug the BeatBuddy into a keyboard amplifier (without the pass-through feature, a performer would need a mixer).

The BeatBuddy is foot-controlled to start and stop the drum machine, and to make fills (fill-in lines and accents) and transitions between beats while it is on. There are rotary knobs for adjusting volume, tempo and choice of drum set. Content navigation through menus is possible with four directional buttons and a central "tap" one, next to the LCD screen.  The LCD screen has a color display, and it uses different colors to indicate different status settings.

Music genres covered by the BeatBuddy include: rock, blues, jazz, pop, Latin, metal, funk, punk, reggae, country, hip-hop, R&B, techno, world, beatboxing, Brazilian, pop brushes, marching, Motown, oldies, and drum and bass. Drum kit sounds include standard drum kit, rock, metal, brushes, jazz, Latin, hand drum, electronic dance, electronic ethereal, and voice.

It also has a headphone output with its volume control in the right side of the enclosure. It has a 5-pin MIDI jack which can work as input or output, allowing the BeatBuddy to be synchronized as "master" or "slave" with other electronic instruments or digital audio devices (such a synthesizer, a music sequencer, or a looper pedal) with MIDI support. By using the MIDI sync, the BeatBuddy and the looper pedal can use the same tempo. It also has two 1/4" outputs and a 1/8" headphone jack, a Mini-B USB port, and an SD Card Slot. The power source is a 9V DC power supply, which is included.

An additional "dual-footswitch" accessory (sold separately) may be plugged into the BeatBuddy to provide control of accent hits, pause/unpause, as well as tap tempo and "hands-free" content navigation. Some users who get the additional pedal put the main BeatBuddy on a tabletop or on a keyboard to make the scrolling buttons easier to access and the screen easier to see.

References

External links
 Official webpage

Effects units
Drum machines
Products introduced in 2014